Shell Key Preserve is an 1,800-acre preserve located on Shell Key in Tierra Verde, Pinellas County in the U.S. state of Florida. The preserve protects sensitive marine habitats and includes one of the county's largest undeveloped barrier islands as well as numerous mangrove islands and expansive sea grass beds.

Shell Key has been designated as one of the state's most important areas for shorebird nesting and wintering and it serves as an important study area for these species. It also is an important area for recreation. A balance for both uses was established by restricting public use to the northern and southern ends of the island. A central core area for conservation is closed to the public.

Boating, camping, and beach-going activities are permitted in public use areas of the preserve. Visitors can access Shell Key only via a water vessel and no restroom facilities are provided. The closest boat ramps, trailer parking, and restroom facilities are located at nearby at Fort De Soto Park.

References

Gulf Coast barrier islands of Florida
Protected areas of Pinellas County, Florida
Nature reserves in Florida
Islands of Pinellas County, Florida
Islands of Florida